Kushak is also called Bainsla village and  the largest village in the Palwal district of the Haryana state in India.  As of the 2011 census, the village had a population of 5487 people. Kushak village sits on the bank of the Yamuna river about 40 miles south-east of the Indian capital New Delhi. It is the largest village of the Bainslat tribe.

Demography
Kushak villagers, called Bainsle, are the founder of all Bainsla villages in NCR. Kushak village a famous of Kushak - Badoli (bainslat). The village had a population of 5,487 at the time of 2011.

There are General category is 6% and OBC(Gujjar) is 75%.  There are no people from Scheduled Tribes in the village but many from the Schedule Castes, who constitute 19.01% of the population

Geography

Education 
  In Village Kushak have Four Govt school and Institute:-
 1.  Govt Sr Sec school - village Kushak near Nahar. Time of British. Its very old school in Gurugram District (Punjab State), later Faridabad District and now Palwal 
 District 
 2. Govt primary school- village Kushak near 33 Foot road,
 3. Govt girls primary school - village Kushak near govt ITI.
 4. Govt Industrial Trading Institute - Village Kushak near Baba Gujjar Chowk. 

 In village Kushak there are three private schools:-
 1. DNB ( Dada Nannu Bainsla) public sr sec school - village Kushak near Govt ITI. ( biggest school  aprox. 1500 student) 
 2. NSV public School - village Kushak near Baba Gujjar Chowk
 3. Javoha public school - village Kushak near Gujjar Mandir

Transport 
  Kushak village connecting with all nearest city as like District Palwal , Sub Tehsil Hassanpur, Block Badoli, National Capital Delhi, all time Kushak village have Good Facility of transport.

References

Villages in Palwal district